Audrey Toll Collins OBE (14 April 1915 – 14 February 2010) was an English cricketer who played as a right-handed batter and right-arm medium bowler. She appeared in one Test match  England in 1937, against Australia. She played domestic cricket for various composite XIs, as well as Middlesex and East Anglia.

Born in India in 1915, she was brought to England by her Australian mother in 1920 after her father's death in World War I. She began her cricketing career at the age of 12, and went on to play one Test match, against Australia at The Oval. She scored 27 on her debut, putting on 54 in half an hour in partnership with Betty Archdale.

In 1983, she became chairman of the Women's Cricket Association, and served in the post until 1994. She was awarded an OBE for her services to the game and was one of the first ten female members of MCC. After her death the England team, on tour in India, wore black armbands during the second One Day International and both teams observed a minute's silence in her honour before the game.

There is now an Audrey Collins Cup awarded to girls' cricket teams in Hertfordshire.

References

External links
 
 

1915 births
2010 deaths
England women Test cricketers
Middlesex women cricketers
East Anglia women cricketers
Officers of the Order of the British Empire